Robert Boyle (1627–1691) was an Anglo-Irish natural philosopher, chemist, physicist, and inventor

Robert Boyle or Bob Boyle may also refer to:

Robert Edward Boyle (1809–1854), British politician
Robert Boyle, 11th Earl of Cork (1864–1934), British peer
Robert William Boyle (1883–1955), Canadian physicist
Bob Boyle (footballer) (1876–1927), Australian rules footballer
Robert F. Boyle (1909–2010), American director of art and film
Bob Boyle (animator) (born 1971), American animator
Robert Boyle-Walsingham (1736–1780), Irish politician and sailor
Robert H. Boyle (1928–2017), American author and environmental activist

See also  
 Boyle